Dyberry Creek is a  tributary of the Lackawaxen River in Wayne County, Pennsylvania, in the United States.

Dyberry Creek joins the Lackawaxen River at Honesdale. The creek is formed by the confluence of two branches: the east and west.

The creek and its branches are often stocked with trout.

See also
List of rivers of Pennsylvania

References

External links
U.S. Geological Survey: PA stream gaging stations

Rivers of Pennsylvania
Tributaries of the Lackawaxen River
Rivers of Wayne County, Pennsylvania